Burwick is a small harbour on the island of South Ronaldsay in the Orkney Islands, Scotland.  It is the closest Orkney harbour to the Scottish mainland and is the terminus of a passenger ferry which operates in the summer to John o' Groats in Caithness.

The name was first recorded in about 1225 as "Bardvik", derived from the Old Norse bar vík, meaning "bay of the extremity", for its position near the southernmost point of the island.

The remains of the Castle of Burwick, a defended Iron Age fort and probable secondary monastic settlement, occupy the promontory west of the harbour.

References

External links

Ports and Harbours of the UK - Burwick, South Ronaldsay
Canmore - Three Friends: Burwick, 19th century shipwreck.
Canmore - Burwick Lifeboat Station

Villages in Orkney